Ronald Lee Kline (March 9, 1932 – June 22, 2002) was an American professional baseball player. He played in Major League Baseball as a right-handed pitcher over parts of seventeen seasons (1952, 1955–1970) with the Pittsburgh Pirates, St. Louis Cardinals, Los Angeles Angels, Detroit Tigers, Washington Senators, Minnesota Twins, San Francisco Giants, Boston Red Sox and Atlanta Braves. For his career, he compiled a 114–144 record in 736 appearances, most as a relief pitcher, with a 3.75 earned run average and 989 strikeouts.

Kline missed the 1953–1954 baseball seasons due to military service.

Kline was born in Callery, Pennsylvania, and returned there to serve as mayor after leaving baseball. He died in Callery in June 2002, aged 70. He had heart and kidney problems at the time of his death.

See also
 List of Major League Baseball annual saves leaders

References

External links

Ron Kline at SABR (Baseball BioProject)

1932 births
2002 deaths
Pittsburgh Pirates players
St. Louis Cardinals players
Los Angeles Angels players
Boston Red Sox players
Minnesota Twins players
Detroit Tigers players
Washington Senators (1961–1971) players
San Francisco Giants players
Atlanta Braves players
Major League Baseball pitchers
Baseball players from Pennsylvania
Bartlesville Pirates players
New Orleans Pelicans (baseball) players
Burlington-Graham Pirates players
Hawaii Islanders players
People from Butler County, Pennsylvania